The anthem of the Altai Republic is the title of the anthem of the Altai Republic, a federal subject of Russia. The music was composed by Vladimir Peshnyak, and the lyrics were written by Arzhan Adarov. It was adopted officially on 11 September 2001.

Lyrics
The first three verses are sung in the Republic's official and native language, Altai, and the last two are sung in the Republic's state official language, Russian.

Notes

References

External links
School website page on the Altai Republic, with the lyrics of the anthem
http://kurultai.altai-republic.ru/docs/gimn.pdf

Altai Republic
Regional songs
Culture of the Altai Republic
National anthem compositions in E major